Artan Bushati (4 October 1963 – 29 August 2013) was an Albanian football coach who is most noted for leading the Albania U21 national team between 2005 and 2011.

Managerial career
He has also managed KF Elbasani as well as his hometown club Vllaznia Shkodër shortly prior to his death.

Political career
He was also active in politics and even ran for Socialist Movement for Integration in Shkodër during the 2013 parliamentary elections.

Personal life
He was also a professor of physical education at the Luigj Gurakuqi University.

References

1963 births
2013 deaths
Sportspeople from Shkodër
Albanian football managers
KF Vllaznia Shkodër managers
KF Elbasani managers
Albania national under-21 football team managers
Kategoria Superiore managers